Gürcü Mehmed Pasha (also known with the epithet Hadım, "eunuch"; died 1665, Buda) was an Ottoman statesman. He was grand vizier of the Ottoman Empire between 27 September 1651 and 20 June 1652.

He was the former slave of Koca Sinan Pasha, a previous, prominent grand vizier.

See also
 List of Ottoman Grand Viziers

References

17th-century Grand Viziers of the Ottoman Empire
Muslims from Georgia (country)
Georgians from the Ottoman Empire
1665 deaths
Year of birth missing
Eunuchs from the Ottoman Empire